Los Caudillos, is a Mexican telenovela produced by Televisa and originally transmitted by Telesistema Mexicano.

Cast 
 Silvia Pinal as Jimena
 Enrique Rambal as Miguel Hidalgo
 Magda Guzmán as Josefa Ortiz de Domínguez
 Narciso Busquets as José María Morelos
 Ofelia Guilmáin as Felipa
Carlos Bracho as Ignacio Allende
 Enrique Lizalde as Lisandro Jiménez
 Guillermo Aguilar as Juan Aldama
 Sergio Jiménez as Nicolás Bravo
 Enrique del Castillo as Padre Huesca
Emma Roldán as Belisaria
 José Baviera as Carlos IV
 Raúl Meraz as Fernando VII
 José Alonso as Francisco Javier Mina
 Wally Barrón as Virrey Félix María Calleja
 Malena Doria as María Antonieta
 Gregorio Casal as Lic. González

References

External links 

Mexican telenovelas
Televisa telenovelas
Spanish-language telenovelas
1968 telenovelas
1968 Mexican television series debuts
1968 Mexican television series endings